Richard Kaigoma Sseruwagi (born 8 August 1954), is a Swedish-based Ugandan actor and musician. He is best known for the critics acclaimed role "Sekou" in the award winning Swedish movie While We Live.

Personal life
He was born on 8 August 1954 in Matanga, Masaka, Uganda. He studied at the Abafumi Theater Academy in Kampala, Uganda.

Career
He fled from the country in 1977 during the rule of dictator Idi Amin having incurred the dictator's wrath due to Sseruwagi's political theatre engagements. In 1978, he was granted asylum in Sweden and eventually became a Swedish citizen. 

He started to act in Swedish theatre for many years. Gradually, he became a popular actor in Sweden particularly with the drama series Tre Kronor (Three Crowns) which opened doors for his film carrier.

In 2019, he acted in the Swedish film While We Live directed by Dani Kouyaté. The film received critics acclaim and screened in several film festivals. The film later won the award for  Best Film by an African Living Abroad at the Africa Movie Academy Awards in Lagos, Nigeria.

Apart from acting, Sseruwagi is also a recording artist.

Filmography

References

External links
 

Living people
Ugandan actors
Swedish actors
Swedish musicians
1954 births